WGB may be:
 William Garden Blaikie
 William Gates Building, Cambridge, England
 Wonderful Grand Band, a music and comedy group from Newfoundland, Canada
 WGB Global Recycling, Italy - Integrated System for Treatment and Re-cycling of Solid Urban Waste
 Workgroup Bridge, to connect devices in a wired LAN with a WLAN
 We Got Braids, Slotcar team from Finland